"I Ain't No Quitter" is a song by the Canadian singer Shania Twain. It was the third and final single released from her 2004 Greatest Hits album. The song was written by Twain and her then-husband, Robert John "Mutt" Lange. "I Ain't No Quitter" was originally released to country radio on May 2, 2005. The commercial singles in Europe were released on July 12, 2005. With no promotion by Twain and little by the record label, "I Ain't No Quitter" is one of Twain's lowest peaking singles. Despite this, Twain performed the song on her Still the One residency and Rock This Country Tour.

Critical reception
Chuck Taylor of Billboard magazine appreciated the single and said it was "catchy as all get out, while winking in the face of a classic country theme. It's an appreciable effort that should sparkle on the summer airwaves."

Music video

The music video for "I Ain't No Quitter" was shot in Tijuana, Mexico, in March 2005, directed by Wayne Isham. It was released on May 5, 2005. The video is set in a country bar where there is a line dancing competition going on. The dancers throw in a bit of hip-hop influenced dancing. To keep with the country theme of the song and video, Twain wears a cowboy hat in every scene. The video is available on select CD singles of "I Ain't No Quitter".

Chart performance
"I Ain't No Quitter" entered the Billboard Hot Country Singles & Tracks chart in the week of May 21, 2005, at number 55. The single spent eight weeks on the chart and climbed to a peak position of number 45 on July 2, 2005, where it remained for one week. "I Ain't No Quitter" was Twain's lowest peaking single since "God Bless the Child", which peaked at number 48 in 1997.

Track listings
These are the formats for major releases.

UK CD Single
"I Ain't No Quitter" - 3:30
"Whose Bed Have Your Boots Been Under?" (Live) - 4:27
"I Ain't Going Down" (Live) - 4:01
Enhanced: "I Ain't No Quitter" - Music Video

Germany CD Single
"I Ain't No Quitter" - 3:30
"Whose Bed Have Your Boots Been Under?" (Live) - 4:27

Charts

Release history

References

2005 singles
Shania Twain songs
Music videos directed by Wayne Isham
Songs written by Robert John "Mutt" Lange
Song recordings produced by Robert John "Mutt" Lange
Songs written by Shania Twain
Mercury Records singles
Mercury Nashville singles
2004 songs